John Elton Keane (born 17 April 1952) is a British BAFTA and BFI Award-winning film and television composer. He has been nominated for two British Academy of Film and Television Arts (BAFTA) awards, for A Very British Coup in 1989 and Hornblower: The Even Chance in 1999.

Keane's many credits include the 1993 miniseries Tales of the City, the 1998 film Hideous Kinky, and multiple installments of Hornblower between 1998 and 2003.

Early years
Keane studied composition at the Guildhall School of Music and Drama with Edmund Rubbra, and piano with Geraldine Peppin. He went on to study sound recording and film music at the National Film and Television School. While there, he scored many graduation films, and his successful career as a composer was launched with his score for Careless Talk, which won the BAFTA Short Film Award in 1986. Keane quickly established himself in the film and television music industry in 1987, when he scored The Kitchen Toto, directed by Harry Hook. The film won the Tokyo Grand Prize, and Keane won a prize for Best Soundtrack at the Festival International du Film et de la Jeunesse. The same year, he won the 1987 British Film Institute prize for Young Composer of the Year.

Film and TV
Keane's first television commission was for the highly acclaimed serial A Very British Coup for director Mick Jackson. The serial received many awards, including an International Emmy for Best Drama, five BAFTA Awards, a BAFTA Nomination for Best Music, Best Drama Series from Broadcasting Press Guild, and at the Banff Festival.
Since then, Keane has written the music for a host of high-profile television dramas, including Selling Hitler, Tales from the City, A Pinch of Snuff, Faith, Hearts and Minds, Kavanagh QC, Plotlands, Far from the Madding Crowd, Wives and Daughters, The Last of the Blonde Bombshells, Monsignor Renard, Anna Karenina, The Russian Bride, Gunpowder, Treason & Plot, Mansfield Park, the Emmy Award-winning Hornblower, and Heroes and Villains: "Shogun and Cortes".

Keane has written music for a number of award-winning documentary series, including Molly Dineen's BBC The Ark, winner of a BAFTA Award, and The House, about London's Royal Opera House. He has also written music for a number of feature films, including four films directed by Gilles McKinnon—Small Faces, Trojan Eddie, Hideous Kinky, and Tara Road.

His recent credits include the BBC crime drama series Case Histories and Inspector George Gently.

Credits

Television
2014
 Inspector George Gently – Blue for Bluebird
 Inspector George Gently – Gently Between the Lines
2013
 Case Histories
2012
 Inspector George Gently – Gently in the Cathedral
 Inspector George Gently – The Lost Child
2008
 Sleep with Me
 Gently's Last Case
2007
 Mansfield Park
 Who Gets the Dog?
 Inspector George Gently – Gently Go Man
2006
 Perfect Day (The Funeral)
2005
 Wallis & Edward
 Uncle Adolf
 Tom Brown's Schooldays
2004
 Gunpowder, Treason & Plot
 The Brief
 Sparkling Cyanide
 A Line in the Sand
2002
 Bait
 Night Flight
2001
 The Russian Bride
 Hornblower (series 1,2,3)
2000
 Monsignor Renard (4 episodes)
 The Last of the Blonde Bombshells
 Anna Karenina
1999
 Kavanagh QC Series V
 Pure Wickedness
 Wives and Daughters (1 episode)
1998
 Far from the Madding Crowd
 Kavanagh QC Series IV
1997
 Plotlands (6-part serial)
 Stone Scissors Paper
 Kavanagh QC Series III
1996
 Kavanagh QC Series II
1995
 Killing Me Softly
 Mrs Hartley & the Growth Centre
 I'll Be Watching You
1994
 Faith
 A Pinch of Snuff
1993
 Circle of Deceit
 Tales of the City
 Maigret (2 episodes)
 Love and Reason (3 episodes)
1992
 Force of Duty
 The Last of His Tribe
 The Count of Solar
 The Hummingbird Tree
1991
 The Gravy Train Goes East
 Selling Hitler
 One Man's War
1990
 Murder East Murder West
 Stolen
 The Gravy Train
1988
 Defrosting the Fridge
 A Very British Coup
 Leaving
1985
 Careless Talk

Feature films
2005
 Tara Road
1998
 Hideous Kinky
1997
 A Further Gesture
1996
 Letters from the East
 Trojan Eddie
 Small Faces
1990
 Windprints
1989
 Chattahoochee
 Resurrected
1987
 The Kitchen Toto
1986
 Nanou

Documentaries
2008
 Heroes and Villains – Cortes
 Heroes and Villains – Shogun
2006
 Wolf
2003
 Out of the Ashes
2002
 Princess to Queen
2001
 The English Civil War
1996
 The House
1994
 True Brits: The Foreign Office
1993
 English Women's Garden
 The Ark
1991
 Billy – A Violent Mind
1989
 EastEnd GP's
 Landshapes
1986
 Movie Masterclass

References

External links
 

1952 births
Living people
British film score composers
British male film score composers
British television composers
Musicians from London
People from St Pancras, London
Alumni of the National Film and Television School